Girolamo de Terminis (died 27 October 1561) was a Roman Catholic prelate who served as Bishop of Mazara del Vallo (1543–1561).

Biography
On 6 August 1543, Girolamo de Terminis was appointed by Pope Paul III as Bishop of Mazara del Vallo. He served as Bishop of Mazara del Vallo until his death on 27 October 1561.

While bishop, he was the principal consecrator of Bartolomé Sebastián de Aroitia, Bishop of Patti, and Francisco Orozco de Arce, Archbishop of Palermo.

References

External links and additional sources
 (for Chronology of Bishops) 
 (for Chronology of Bishops) 

16th-century Roman Catholic bishops in Sicily
1561 deaths
Bishops appointed by Pope Paul III